Elder, New South Wales is a remote rural locality and civil parish of Yungnulgra County in far North West New South Wales.

Geography
The Parish an arid landscape. The nearest town is Whitecliffs 2 km to the south.

Climate
The parish has extremely hot summers and mild winters. The parish has a Köppen climate classification of BWh (Hot desert),. is almost unpopulated, with less than two inhabitants per square kilometer.

References

Localities in New South Wales